Princess Viggo, Countess of Rosenborg  (née Eleanor Margaret Green; November 5, 1895 – July 3, 1966) was an American who became a Princess in Denmark. By her marriage to Prince Viggo, Count of Rosenborg, Green became Princess Viggo, Countess of Rosenborg.

Early life 
On November 5, 1895, Green was born as 
Eleanor Margaret Green in New York City, New York. Green's parents were  Dr. James Oliver Green and Amelia Hewitt Green. Green's maternal grandfather was Abram S. Hewitt and her maternal great-grandfather was Peter Cooper.

Personal life 
Green married Prince Viggo of Denmark, Viggo Christian Adolph George, son of Prince Valdemar of Denmark and Princess Marie Amélie Françoise Hélène d'Orléans, on June 10, 1924, in New York City.

Without the legally required permission of the Danish king for a dynastic marriage, Prince Viggo renounced his place in Denmark's line of succession to the Crown, his title of Prince of Denmark, and his style of Royal Highness as was customary in the Danish royal house upon marriage to a commoner. Before the wedding Viggo, with the king's authorisation, assumed the title of His Highness Prince Viggo, Count of Rosenborg.

In connection with the marriage and her husband's new title, Eleanor Margaret Green became Her Highness Princess Viggo, Countess of Rosenborg.

Prince and Princess Viggo had no children. The couple lived at Bernstorff Palace in Denmark. Princess Viggo was active in charity work.

She died on July 3, 1966, at age 70 at Copenhagen, Denmark.

References

Citations

Bibliography

 
 

1895 births
1966 deaths
Danish princesses
American emigrants to Denmark
Burials at Roskilde Cathedral
Eleanor Margaret Green
People from New York City
People from Gentofte Municipality
Eleanor Margaret Green